The 1938 All-Ireland Senior Football Championship Final was the 51st All-Ireland Final and the deciding match of the 1938 All-Ireland Senior Football Championship, an inter-county Gaelic football tournament for the top teams in Ireland.

Kerry supporters complained that the final whistle had gone too early in the first match, disallowing a late John Joe Landers winner. When the replay ended before Kerry could take a free which could have given an equalising goal, angry fans invaded the pitch. A loudspeaker appeal allowed the game to continue, and Galway won anyway.

Bobby Beggs lined out for the winning Galway team that day; he had earlier been on the Dublin side defeated by Galway in the final of 1934.

References

External links
, a British Pathé newsreel of the game

All-Ireland Senior Football Championship Final
All-Ireland Senior Football Championship Final, 1938
All-Ireland Senior Football Championship Finals
Gaelic football controversies
Galway county football team matches
Kerry county football team matches